Jung Ji-woo (also spelled as Chung Ji-woo; born May 7, 1968) is a South Korean film director. He is best known for his films Happy End (1999) and A Muse (2012).

Filmography
Somebody (2022) - director
Tune in for Love (2019) - director
Heart Blackened (2017) - director
Fourth Place (2015) - director
정지우x김무열x조은지 Project (short film, 2012) - director
A Muse (2012) - director, screenplay, producer
Moss (2010) - screenplay
Modern Boy (2008) - director, screenplay
If You Were Me 2 "A Boy With the Knapsack" (2006) - director
Two or Three Things I Know about Kim Ki-young (documentary, 2006) - interviewee
Blossom Again (2005) - director, screenplay, editor
Happy End (1999) - director, screenplay
Deep, Round and Dark (short film, 1999) - actor
We Can't Share A Toilet (short film, 1999) - actor
Skate (1998) - assistant director
A Bit Bitter (short film, 1996) - director, screenplay, editor
Just Do It (short film, 1996) - adapted screenplay
Grandfather (short film, 1995) - cinematographer, lighting, actor
Cat Woman & Man (short film, 1995) - cinematographer, editor, actor
Cliffy (short film, 1994) - director, screenplay, editor
The Expedition (short film, 1994) - cinematographer

References

External links
 
 
 

South Korean film directors
South Korean screenwriters
1968 births
Living people